Mary Ellen Higgins Hawkins (April 18, 1923 – January 7, 2023) was an American politician in the state of Florida. She served in the Florida House of Representatives from 1974 to 1994, representing Collier County.

In December 2014, it was announced that Hawkins would be honored as one of the "Women Who Make Southwest Florida" in a ceremony in March 2015.

Hawkins died on January 7, 2023, at the age of 99.

References

External links

|-

|-

1923 births
2023 deaths
Politicians from Birmingham, Alabama
People from Naples, Florida
University of Alabama alumni
Republican Party members of the Florida House of Representatives
Women state legislators in Florida
20th-century American politicians
20th-century American women politicians